Barbara Jean Lawton (née Inkpen; 28 October 1949 – 3 September 2021) was a track and field athlete from England, who mainly competed in the high jump event during her career.

Athletics career
Inkpen trained at Aldershot, Farnham & District AC and represented Great Britain at two Summer Olympics (1968 and 1972). She represented England and won a gold medal in the high jump event, at the 1974 British Commonwealth Games in Christchurch, New Zealand. She was also runner up in the 1972 Sports Woman Of The Year.

References

External links
 

1949 births
2021 deaths
People from Farnham
Sportspeople from Surrey
British female high jumpers
English female high jumpers
Olympic athletes of Great Britain
Athletes (track and field) at the 1968 Summer Olympics
Athletes (track and field) at the 1972 Summer Olympics
Commonwealth Games gold medallists for England
Commonwealth Games medallists in athletics
Athletes (track and field) at the 1974 British Commonwealth Games
European Athletics Championships medalists
Medallists at the 1974 British Commonwealth Games